The Seychelles Basketball League (SBL) is the premier basketball league for clubs in Seychelles. The league consist out of ten teams (in 2022).

The champions of the SBL are eligible to play in the qualifying rounds of the Basketball Africa League (BAL). The league began in 1993, when club basketball teams were introduced on the Seychelles.

Current teams 
The following were the ten teams for the 2019 season:
Premium Cobras
Beau Vallon Heat
Praslin Warriors
Razors
RC Dynamics
Mont Fleuri Dawgz
BAYA
Anse Boileau Angels
PLS Hawks
MBU Rockers

Champions 

 2001: PLS Hawks
 2002: PLS Hawks
 2003: Premium Cobras
 2004: Premium Cobras
 2005: PLS Hawks
 2006: Premium Cobras
 2007: PLS Hawks
 2008: unknown
 2009: PLS Hawks
 2010: PLS Hawks
 2011: PLS Hawks
 2012: PLS Hawks
 2013: PLS Hawks
 2014: PLS Hawks
 2015: unknown
 2016: unknown
 2017: unknown
 2018: Beau Vallon Heat
 2019: unknown
 2020: unknown
 2021: unknown

Finals

References

External links
Seychelles at AfroBasket.com

Basketball in Seychelles
Basketball leagues in Africa
Sports leagues in Seychelles